Ryan Fyffe (born 21 May 2001) is a Scottish footballer who plays as a defender for Buckie Thistle.

Early life
Fyffe was born in Inverness.

Career
Having come through the youth academy at Inverness Caledonian Thistle, Fyffe was one of nine Inverness players to join Fort William on loan for the 2019–20 season. He won Fort William's 'player of the season' award for the 2019–20 season, but was released by Inverness at the end of the season.

He returned to Inverness Caledonian Thistle in September 2020, however, and signed a new contract with the club. He made his debut for the club on 24 October 2020 in a 1–1 draw with Ayr United, with Fyffe providing the assist for Thistle's goal. In December 2020, Fyffe went out on a month long loan to fellow Invernesian side Clachnacuddin. In August 2021, Fyffe again went out on loan, this time to Nairn County, also in the Highland League.

Career statistics

Honours
Individual
Fort William Player of the Season: 2019–20

References

External links
 

Living people
2001 births
Scottish footballers
Footballers from Inverness
Association football defenders
Inverness Caledonian Thistle F.C. players
Fort William F.C. players
Highland Football League players
Scottish Professional Football League players
Clachnacuddin F.C. players
Nairn County F.C. players
Buckie Thistle F.C. players